Lotus flower usually refers to the pink or white flower of Nelumbo nucifera, the "Indian lotus".  

"Lotus flower" may also refer to a flower of any of the list of plants known as lotus, or:

Art
The flower of Nymphaea caerulea, the blue lotus (or Nymphaea lotus, the white lotus) 
 Sacred lotus in religious art, a lotus flower as a religious symbol in Buddhist & Hindu art 
Lotus throne, a base for a figure in art, formed like a lotus flower in Buddhist & Hindu art

Music
 "Die Lotosblume", a poem written by Heinrich Heine which was put to music by Robert Schumann
 Lotosblume, an 1989 album by Die Flippers
 Lotus Flower (Woody Shaw album), 1982
 Lotus Flower, a 1999 album by Steve Turre, or its title song
 Lotusflow3r, a 2009 album by Prince
 "Lotus Flower" (song), a 2011 song by Radiohead

Places
 Lotus Flower Tower, a mountain peak in Canada

See also
Lotus Blossom (film), a 1921 film
"Lotus Blossom", a jazz song written by Billy Strayhorn most famously recorded by Duke Ellington in 1967